Todabhim is a city and a "municipality" in Karauli district in the Indian state of Rajasthan. It is headquarters of todabhim sub division, tehsil and C&RD block of karauli district.

History
Todabhim is a prominent historical site since this is where Shri Jagannath Singh Ji's family  is believed to have ruled for over 500 years in Todabhim city.   & Meena Kings also ruled on Todabhim City  

In ancient times, Todabhim came under the rule of the Matsya Kingdom. 

How to reach

Todabhim is accessible by road and by railroads. Balaji mod bus stop on national expressway 21 is 7 km. Which has stoppage of mostly all type of bus services plying towards agra and jaipur. Frequent taxi and paid autorickshaws are available. Bandikui Jn on delhi-Jaipur section and Hindaun city on delhi- Kota section of indian railways are Major railhead, about 45 km both from here. Jaipur international airport is nearest airport.

Todabhim Tehsil Population, Caste, Religion Data
Todabhim Tehsil of Karauli district has total population of 251,180 as per the Census 2011. Out of which 134,604 are males while 116,576 are females. In 2011 there were total 43,488 families residing in Todabhim Tehsil. The Average Sex Ratio of Todabhim Tehsil is 866.

As per Census 2011 out of total population, 9.1% people lives in Urban areas while 90.9% lives in the Rural areas. The average literacy rate in urban areas is 73.7% while that in the rural areas is 68.1%. Also the Sex Ratio of Urban areas in Todabhim Tehsil is 902 while that of Rural areas is 863.

The population of Children of age 0-6 years in Todabhim Tehsil is 40801 which is 16% of the total population. There are 22208 male children and 18593 female children between the age 0-6 years. Thus as per the Census 2011 the Child Sex Ratio of Todabhim Tehsil is 837 which is less than Average Sex Ratio ( 866 ) of Todabhim Tehsil.
Tehsil.

Climate 
Temperature in summer ranges between 25°C and 45°C and in winter it is between 2°C and 23°C.

Todabhim Tehsil Data
As per the Population Census 2011 data, following are some quick facts about Todabhim Tehsil.

References

External links
 
 
 
 
 

Cities and towns in Karauli district